The Niagara College Teaching Winery (NCT), Canada's first commercial teaching winery, is located at the Niagara-on-the-Lake Campus of Niagara College within the Niagara Region of Ontario. Situated in the heart of Niagara wine country, the NCT is the centre for applied wine education for the Canadian wine industry. Officially opened in November 2002, the winery began production in 2001. With three on-site teaching and research vineyards, Winery and Viticulture students are taught the day-to-day responsibilities and inner workings of a winery, from planting grapes to selling wine. Students form teams dedicated to making a specific variety of wine.  The Wine Business Management program provides students expertise in the business, retail, marketing and export aspects of the growing wine industry.
The facility operates strictly on a non-profit, cost recovery basis with all revenue from sales re-invested into the winery program.

The campus is enveloped in an ecological band of wetlands, vineyards at the base of the Niagara Escarpment, a World Biosphere Reserve, becoming a living laboratory for the programs. At the time of The War of 1812, the Black Swamp could be found where the campus stands today. With  of production vineyards plus the Jack Forrer teaching and demonstration vineyard, the winery provides students with practical, hands-on training that prepares them for the workplace.

Programs

Winery and Viticulture Technician Diploma Program
Wine Business Management(Post-Graduate)
Wine Industry Certificates
Winemaking I Certificate
Winemaking II Certificate
Viticulture/Vineyard Management Certificate
Wine Marketing and Management Certificate
Master Taster Certificate

Wine Industry Seminars and Workshops
Niagara College Teaching Winery hosts various wine industry seminars and workshops. These workshops help to broaden knowledge and give training in related areas.

Wine Sensory Laboratory

Completed in April 2007, the wine sensory lab enhances the training of students enrolled in wine and viticulture, sommelier, culinary and hospitality and tourism programs.   With 40 wine-tasting stations, recessed light tables and sinks, the theatre-style lab is designed to provide the appropriate physical and technical resources to assess and appreciate wine. The lab also includes a smaller, more traditional wine-tasting room often found at Ontario's wineries.
 In 2007 the Sensory Lab was the site of a Vintner's Quality Alliance seminar focused on the production of quality wines for Ontario's winemakers. The Niagara College Wine Sensory Lab, the first of its kind in wine country, is designed to focus attention on the wine. Allowing the taster to truly appreciate all aspects of Canadian wines.

Events

The Niagara College Teaching Winery and its students participate in events around the country and the world.  Annual Events include:
January/February: Niagara Icewine Festival
February/March: Cuveé
March:  In Your Backyard Horticultural Open House
May:  Wine & Herb Festival
June:  New Vintage Festival
September: Niagara Grape & Wine Festival
October: Niagara Food Festival
November: Taste The Season

Icewine
NCT students experience the Icewine harvest first hand. With vineyards right on campus, students are called to pick the grapes when the optimum temperatures are reached. Students work through each step of the Icewine process from the vine right through the crush and up to the point of bottling. Many students are from foreign countries and distant areas of Canada and are proud to be part of making one of Canada's most internationally renowned products. Each year NCT Winery produces different varieties of Icewine, giving the students diverse knowledge of different styles.
NCT Icewines are available at the Icewine gala, Icewine Festival and in the NCT Winery's own wine store during the month of January.

Awards
NCT Winery has won more than 60 national and international awards for its VQA wines since its inception.

References

External links
Niagara College Teaching Winery
Niagara College Canada

Wineries of the Niagara Peninsula
Higher education in Ontario